Panthera balamoides was described as an extinct species of big cat in the genus Panthera that lived in the Yucatan Peninsula during the Pleistocene. The initial description suggested it to be a type of a climbing cat. The fossil was found associated to 13,400 year old human remains and it was found by underwater cave researcher Jerónimo Avilés, a local scientist in 2011.

Description
Panthera balamoides was described based on the distal third of a right humerus from the submerged El Pit cenote near Tulum in Quintana Roo, Mexico.

However, a 2019 study on Yucatan carnivorans suggested that the Panthera balamoides holotype may actually be misidentified remains of Arctotherium (a tremarctine bear), whose remains have also been found in Yucatan. If so, this would explain the unusual robustness of the bone and render Panthera balamoides an invalid species. Another study on jaguar fossils also considered P. balamoides to be an ursid.

References 

balamoides
balamoides
Pleistocene Mexico
Fossils of Mexico
Pleistocene extinctions
Fossil taxa described in 2019